Daniel Alexander Ige (born August 6, 1991) is an American mixed martial artist currently competing in UFC's Featherweight division. A professional since 2014, he has also competed for the Legacy Fighting Championship, Pancrase, the RFA, and Titan FC. As of December 13, 2022, he is #13 in the UFC featherweight rankings.

Mixed martial arts career
Ige started his career out with 10 amateur fights. He compiled an 8–2 record before going pro. He started his pro career with a 2–1 record. He then rattled off 6 straight victories competing for various regional promotions including a win on Dana White's Contender Series 3.

Ultimate Fighting Championship
Ige signed with the UFC after earning a victory on Dana White's Contender Series (DWCS). He was expected to face Charles Rosa in his debut at UFC 220. However, Rosa pulled out of the fight citing a neck injury. Ige remained on the card and faced fellow newcomer and DWCS alum Julio Arce. He lost the fight via unanimous decision.

Ige faced Mike Santiago on June 9, 2018 at UFC 225. He won the fight via TKO in the first round.

Ige faced promotional newcomer Jordan Griffin on December 15, 2018 at UFC on Fox 31. He won the fight via unanimous decision.

Ige faced Danny Henry on March 16, 2019 at UFC Fight Night 147. He won the fight via a rear-naked choke submission in the first round. The win also earned Ige his first Performance of the Night bonus award.

Ige faced Kevin Aguilar on June 22, 2019 at UFC Fight Night 154. He won the fight via unanimous decision.

Ige faced Mirsad Bektić on February 8, 2020 at UFC 247. He won the fight via a split decision.

Ige faced Edson Barboza on May 16, 2020 at UFC on ESPN: Overeem vs. Harris. He won the back-and-forth bout via split decision. 16 out of 18 MMA media outlets scored the bout in favor of Barboza.

Ige faced Calvin Kattar on July 16, 2020 at UFC on ESPN: Kattar vs. Ige. He lost the fight via unanimous decision.

Ige was scheduled to face Ryan Hall on March 13, 2021 at UFC Fight Night 187. However, Hall pulled out of the fight on February 11 due to undisclosed reasons. Instead, Ige faced off against Gavin Tucker at UFC Fight Night 187. He won the fight via knockout in the first round. This win earned him the Performance of the Night award.

Ige faced Chan Sung Jung at UFC on ESPN 25 on June 19, 2021. He lost the fight via unanimous decision, getting outgrappled throughout the fight.

Ige faced Josh Emmett on December 11, 2021 at UFC 269. He lost the fight via unanimous decision.

Ige faced Movsar Evloev on June 4, 2022 at UFC Fight Night 207.  He lost the fight via unanimous decision.

Ige faced Damon Jackson January 14, 2023, at UFC Fight Night 217. He won the fight via knockout in the second round. This win earned him the Performance of the Night bonus.

Personal life
Ige and his wife Savannah have a son, Bam (born 2021).

Championships and accomplishments

Mixed martial arts
Ultimate Fighting Championship
Performance of the Night (Three times)

Mixed martial arts record

|-
|Win
|align=center|16–6
|Damon Jackson
|KO (punch)
|UFC Fight Night: Strickland vs. Imavov
|
|align=center|2
|align=center|4:13
|Las Vegas, Nevada, United States
|
|-
|Loss
|align=center|15–6
|Movsar Evloev
|Decision (unanimous)
|UFC Fight Night: Volkov vs. Rozenstruik
|
|align=center|3
|align=center|5:00
|Las Vegas, Nevada, United States
|
|-
|Loss
|align=center|15–5
|Josh Emmett
|Decision (unanimous)
|UFC 269
|
|align=center|3
|align=center|5:00
|Las Vegas, Nevada, United States
|
|-
|Loss
|align=center|15–4
|Jung Chan-sung
|Decision (unanimous)
|UFC on ESPN: The Korean Zombie vs. Ige
|
|align=center|5
|align=center|5:00
|Las Vegas, Nevada, United States
|
|-
|Win
|align=center|15–3
|Gavin Tucker
|KO (punch)
|UFC Fight Night: Edwards vs. Muhammad
|
|align=center|1
|align=center|0:22
|Las Vegas, Nevada, United States
|
|-
|Loss
|align=center|14–3
|Calvin Kattar
|Decision (unanimous)
|UFC on ESPN: Kattar vs. Ige
|
|align=center|5
|align=center|5:00
|Abu Dhabi, United Arab Emirates
|
|-
|Win
|align=center|14–2
|Edson Barboza
|Decision (split)
|UFC on ESPN: Overeem vs. Harris
|
|align=center|3
|align=center|5:00
|Jacksonville, Florida, United States
|
|-
|Win
|align=center|13–2
|Mirsad Bektić
|Decision (split)
|UFC 247
|
|align=center|3
|align=center|5:00
|Houston, Texas, United States
|
|-
|Win
|align=center|12–2
|Kevin Aguilar
|Decision (unanimous)
|UFC Fight Night: Moicano vs. The Korean Zombie
|
|align=center|3
|align=center|5:00
|Greenville, South Carolina, United States
|
|-
|Win
|align=center|11–2
|Danny Henry
|Submission (rear-naked choke)
|UFC Fight Night: Till vs. Masvidal
|
|align=center|1
|align=center|1:17
|London, England
|
|-
|Win
|align=center|10–2
|Jordan Griffin
|Decision (unanimous)
|UFC on Fox: Lee vs. Iaquinta 2
|
|align=center|3
|align=center|5:00
|Milwaukee, Wisconsin, United States
|
|-
|Win
|align=center|9–2
|Mike Santiago 
|TKO (punches)
|UFC 225
|
|align=center|1
|align=center|0:50
|Chicago, Illinois, United States
|
|-
|Loss
|align=center|8–2
|Julio Arce
|Decision (unanimous)
|UFC 220
|
|align=center|3
|align=center|5:00
|Boston, Massachusetts, United States
|
|-
|Win
|align=center|8–1
|Luis Gomez
|Submission (rear-naked choke)
|Dana White's Contender Series 3
|
|align=center|3
|align=center|3:23
|Las Vegas, Nevada, United States
|
|-
|Win
|align=center|7–1
|Ronildo Augusta Brago
|Decision (unanimous)
|Titan FC 44
|
|align=center|3
|align=center|5:00
|Pembroke Pines, Florida, United States
|
|-
|Win
|align=center|6–1
|Fernando Padilla
|Decision (unanimous)
|Cage Fury Fighting Championships
|
|align=center|3
|align=center|5:00
|San Diego, California, United States
|
|-
|Win
|align=center|5–1
|Diego Pichilingue
|Submission (kimura)
|Legacy FC 62
|
|align=center| 2
|align=center| 0:52
|Shawnee, Oklahoma, United States
|
|-
|Win
|align=center|4–1
|Craig Campbell
|TKO (punches)
|Legacy FC 57
|
|align=center|1
|align=center|3:31
|Bossier City, Louisiana, United States
|
|-
|Win
|align=center|3–1
|James Jones
|TKO (doctor stoppage)
|Shogun Fights 14
|
|align=center|1
|align=center|3:56
|Baltimore, Maryland, United States
|
|-
|Loss
|align=center|2–1
|Taichi Nakajima
|Decision (split)
|Pancrase 272
|
|align=center|3
|align=center|5:00
|Honolulu, Hawaii, United States
|
|-
|Win
|align=center|2–0
|Ian Millan
|Submission (rear-naked choke)
|RFA 23
|
|align=center|1
|align=center|1:51
|Costa Mesa, California, United States
|
|-
|Win
|align=center|1–0
|Spencer Higa
|Submission (armbar)
|Star Elite Cage Fighting
|
|align=center|3
|align=center|3:07
|Honolulu, Hawaii, United States
|
|-

See also

 List of current UFC fighters
 List of male mixed martial artists

References

External links
 
 

Living people
1991 births
American male mixed martial artists
American practitioners of Brazilian jiu-jitsu
Featherweight mixed martial artists
American sportspeople of Japanese descent
American male judoka
People awarded a black belt in Brazilian jiu-jitsu
Mixed martial artists from Hawaii
Mixed martial artists utilizing judo
Mixed martial artists utilizing collegiate wrestling
Mixed martial artists utilizing Brazilian jiu-jitsu
American male sport wrestlers
Amateur wrestlers
Sportspeople from Honolulu
Ultimate Fighting Championship male fighters